The Morane-Saulnier T (or Morane-Saulnier MoS.25 A.3) was a French biplane reconnaissance aircraft in 1916 and produced in small numbers during World War I.

Design and development

The Morane-Saulnier T was a large, five-bay biplane of conventional configuration, with unstaggered wings of equal span. The tapered rear fuselage and large triangular vertical stabilizer were reminiscent of those used on Morane-Saulnier's smaller designs but would be a constant cause of problems throughout the types operational service despite attempts to fix the problems. The tractor engines were mounted  in streamlined nacelles supported by struts suspended between the wings and the propellers on the Type T were sometimes fitted with large spinners. The landing gear consisted of two main units, each of which had two wheels joined by a long axle, plus a tailskid and an auxiliary nosewheel. Three open cockpits in tandem were provided, with one gunner in the nose, and another behind the wing, while the pilot was under the top wing.

Although the similar but larger Type S was designed as a bomber, the French Army ordered the type T in 1916 as a reconnaissance aircraft. Only one example of the preceding Type S bomber had been built, while an order was placed for 90 Morane-Saulnier T aircraft, although older sources suggest that production may have been cancelled before all of these were completed.

Operators

Aéronautique Militaire (no unit was equipped entirely with the MoS.T)
Escadrille C4
Escadrille C11
Escadrille C17
Escadrille C30
Escadrille C39
Escadrille C47

Variants
Morane-Saulnier T company designation for  Le Rhône 9C and  Le Rhône 9Jb powered versions
MoS-25 A.3official French government STAe designation for the T

Specifications (Morane-Saulnier T)

References

Citations

Bibliography

Further reading

1910s French military reconnaissance aircraft
T
Rotary-engined aircraft
Biplanes
Aircraft first flown in 1916